Nicklas Dannevang (born 11 September 1990) is a Danish professional footballer who plays as a goalkeeper for Danish 1st Division club Næstved Boldklub.

Club career

FC Roskilde
Dannevang made his senior debut for FC Roskilde as an 18-year-old in a home game against Skive IK earning a clean sheet in the 2-0 victory.

Nordvest FC
Dannevang joined Nordvest FC on a one-year contract in the summer 2010. He was the second choice in the first season, but became the first choice after the first season. He left the club in the summer 2013.

Brønshøj Boldklub
On 8 August 2013 it was confirmed, that Dannevang had signed a one-year contract with Brønshøj Boldklub. After two good seasons, he was sold.

AC Horsens
AC Horsens confirmed on 22 July 2015, that they had signed Dannevang on a two-year contract.

The manager of the club, Bo Henriksen, announced in May 2017, that Dannevang together with a teammate would be leaving the club in the summer, as their contract expired.

Fremad Amager
On 24 May 2017 it was confirmed by Fremad Amager, that they had signed Dannevang on a permanent deal. The transfer would be valid from 1 July 2017.

Næstved
On 1 February 2021, Dannevang was loaned out to Næstved Boldklub for the rest of the season and would sign permanently for the club at the end of the loan spell, where his contract with Fremad Amager also expired.

References

Danish men's footballers
1990 births
Living people
Holbæk B&I players
FC Roskilde players
Brønshøj Boldklub players
AC Horsens players
Fremad Amager players
Næstved Boldklub players
Danish Superliga players
Danish 1st Division players
Association football goalkeepers